The 1961 Tour de Romandie was the 15th edition of the Tour de Romandie cycle race and was held from 11 to 14 May 1961. The race started in Geneva and finished in Lausanne. The race was won by Louis Rostollan.

General classification

References

1961
Tour de Romandie
1961 Super Prestige Pernod